Zühtü Arslan (born 1 January 1964) is a Turkish judge and the president of the Constitutional Court of Turkey since February 10, 2015.

Arslan was born in Sorgun district of the Yozgat Province in Turkey. In 1987 he graduated from Ankara University The School of Political Sciences. He got his master's degree from University of Leicester in 1996. He later worked as a president of the Turkish National Police Academy. On February 10, 2015, he was elected as the deputy president of the court. 

He is married with four children.

References

External links
 His page on the Constitutional Court's Web site 

1964 births
Living people
People from Sorgun, Yozgat
Turkish civil servants
Turkish judges
Presidents of the Constitutional Court of Turkey